Coleophora algidella is a moth of the family Coleophoridae. It is found in Spain, France, Switzerland, Italy, Norway and Iceland. It has also been recorded from China.

The wingspan is 11–13 mm.

Subspecies
Coleophora algidella algidella
Coleophora algidella meridionalis Toll, 1960 (Spain, Switzerland)
Coleophora algidella qinlingensis Li & Zheng, 1999 (China)

References

algidella
Moths described in 1857
Moths of Europe
Moths of Asia